Notoplanidae is family of free-living marine turbellarian flatworms in the order Polycladida.

Genera 
The following genera are recognised in the family Notoplanidae:
 Anthoplana Bo & Betti, 2019
 Notoplana Laidlaw, 1903
 Plagiotata Plehn, 1896

References 

Turbellaria